Paraburkholderia ferrariae is a gram-negative, catalase and oxidase-positive, non-spore-forming, bacterium from the genus Paraburkholderia and the family Burkholderiaceae which was isolated from a high phosphorus iron ore in the Minas Gerais State in Brazil. Paraburkholderia ferrariae has the ability to solubilize highly insoluble phosphatic minerals.

References

ferrariae
Bacteria described in 2006